In Greek mythology, Prophasis was the personification of excuse. According to Pindar, she was the daughter of "late-thinking" Epimetheus.

Note

References 
 Pindar, Olympian Odes. Pythian Odes, edited and translated by William H. Race, Loeb Classical Library No. 56, Cambridge, Massachusetts, Harvard University Press, 1997. . Online version at Harvard University Press.

Greek goddesses
Personifications in Greek mythology